The 2022 Scottish Men's and Women's Curling Championships were held from February 21 to 27 at the Dumfries Ice Bowl in Dumfries, Scotland. Both the men's and women's events were played in a double round robin which qualified four teams for a page playoff.

Because of the 2022 Winter Olympics, the men's Team Bruce Mouat and the women's Team Eve Muirhead had to withdraw from the event due to a scheduling conflict with the Games.

Men

Teams
The teams are listed as follows:

Round-robin standings
Final round-robin standings

Round-robin results

All draws are listed in Greenwich Mean Time (UTC±00:00).

Draw 1
Monday, February 21, 8:00 am

Draw 2
Monday, February 21, 4:00 pm

Draw 3
Tuesday, February 22, 8:00 am

Draw 4
Tuesday, February 22, 4:00 pm

Draw 5
Wednesday, February 23, 8:00 am

Draw 6
Wednesday, February 23, 4:00 pm

Draw 7
Thursday, February 24, 8:00 am

Draw 8
Thursday, February 24, 4:00 pm

Draw 9
Friday, February 25, 8:00 am

Draw 10
Friday, February 25, 4:00 pm

Playoffs

1 vs. 2
Saturday, February 26, 12:00 pm

Semifinal
Saturday, February 26, 7:00 pm

Final
Sunday, February 27, 11:00 am

Women

Teams
The teams are listed as follows:

Round-robin standings
Final round-robin standings

Round-robin results

All draws are listed in Greenwich Mean Time (UTC±00:00).

Draw 1
Monday, February 21, 12:00 pm

Draw 2
Monday, February 21, 8:00 pm

Draw 3
Tuesday, February 22, 12:00 pm

Draw 4
Tuesday, February 22, 8:00 pm

Draw 5
Wednesday, February 23, 12:00 pm

Draw 6
Wednesday, February 23, 8:00 pm

Draw 7
Thursday, February 24, 12:00 pm

Draw 8
Thursday, February 24, 8:00 pm

Draw 9
Friday, February 25, 12:00 pm

Draw 10
Friday, February 25, 8:00 pm

Playoffs

1 vs. 2
Saturday, February 26, 12:00 pm

Semifinal
Saturday, February 26, 7:00 pm

Final
Sunday, February 27, 4:00 pm

References

External links

2022 in curling
2022 in Scottish sport
Curling competitions in Scotland
February 2022 sports events in the United Kingdom
Sport in Dumfries